Ivana Daniela Santilli  is a Canadian R&B singer and multi-instrumentalist, who has recorded as a solo artist and as a member of the 1990s R&B/pop trio Bass is Base.

Early life and career
Santilli was born to an Italian father and a French-Canadian mother. Santilli's earliest performances began at age 9 playing trumpet for her father's Italian wedding band in Toronto.  Ivana is also fluent in both Italian and French.

Career
During her schooling, she hooked up with her first band, Bass is Base, a band which gained national attention. The trio's funk and soul fusion garnered them a number of Juno, CMVA, and MMVA awards, and they released two albums with A&M/Polygram & Island Records in the U.S.

Bass is Base broke up, and Santilli asked to be released from her contract with A&M records. She wrote and recorded 10 new songs as a solo artist within a month of the breakup. She then began working as a session musician (keyboards, Back up vocals) with various bands:  Soul Attorneys, Women Ah Run Tings, Punjabi by Nature, Holly McNarland.

Santilli began a solo career in 1999. She performed in Toronto at The Bamboo Club in March, and released her album Brown in April. That year she performed in Hamilton as part of Showcase '99.

The album Brown sold very well, outselling some major label releases. The album included soul and bossa nova, as well as drum 'n bass ("Sun + Moon = Tomorrow"), and featured Santilli's vocals, keys, and trumpet.  The album led to a Juno nomination in 2000 as best new solo artist, and also featured '"If Ever I Fall", a duet with singer Glenn Lewis during his early career.

Santilli toured across North America, including a performance at the 1999 Stardust Picnic festival at Historic Fort York, Toronto. She played live with James Brown, Tito Puente, Barenaked Ladies, De La Soul, Jamiroquai, Brand New Heavies, The Fugees, Jann Arden, Maceo Parker, Sylk130, Bahamadia, Pharcyde, and The Roots. One of her three performances during the Montreal Jazz Festival was the subject of a one-hour Bravo! television special. Peer publishing signed her as a writer in the fall of 2000.

In August 2004, she released her second album, Corduroy Boogie, which included the singles, "Deserve", "Superstar" and "What Matters". The video version of "What Matters" appears on a various artists compilation entitled Required Listening. This album featured collaborations with James Poyser, King Britt, Dwele, Dego (4Hero), Kaidi Tatham (Bugz In The Attic), soul legend Omar, Stuart Matthewman (Sade, Maxwell, Sweetback). She then became heavily involved as a keyboardist in remix collaborations for Jazzanova, King Britt, Scuba, Vikter Duplaix, Steven Spacek, All Saints, Appleton: "Don't Worry", Rosey (Def Jam), Roy Ayers, Larry Gold. After touring Japan (blue note), and Europe, in New York, she appeared as an instrumentalist on various soundtrack recordings for film. Her third album TO.NY was released in June, 2008 with the singles "Whateva U Want" and "Been Thru This" which reached #91 on the Canadian Hot 100.

Santilli signed to CP Records and released her fourth studio album, Santilli in June, 2010. The first single is "Your Girl Tonight" and the second single is "Letting Go". Three of the songs on Santilli are new compositions & recordings, 3 are remixes, while the remaining 6 were remastered from TO.NY. An amalgamation of song collaborations with Nasri Atweh, Adam Messinger, Belly, DaHeala, Ethan White

Ivana's 5th studio album entitled  Late Night Light was pre-released on February 13, 2015 and released digitally worldwide on March 10, 2015. It features collaborations with Mike Lindup, Eon Sinclair, Stuart Matthewman.

Santilli began doing Voice Over work in 2015 and has done commercials for Bank of Montreal, Marshall's, WestJet.

Currently she is composing for film. The most recent film score for an indie short art film is set was released in fall of 2021.

Discography

Albums
 April 1999: Brown (Brown Recordings)
 August 2004: Corduroy Boogie (Brown Recordings)
 June 2008: TO.NY (Brown Recordings) review
 June 2010: Santilli (CP Records)
 March 2015: Late Night Light (Brown Recordings)

Singles

References

External links
 Official website
 CTV eTalk interview
 Ivana Santilli at Jam!/Canoe

Canadian contemporary R&B singers
Canadian people of Italian descent
Franco-Ontarian people
Living people
Musicians from Toronto
Santilli, Ivana
1975 births
20th-century Canadian women singers
21st-century Canadian women singers